IL28 or IL-28 may be:

 Ilyushin Il-28, a Cold War-era Soviet ground attack aircraft
 Interleukin 28, a cytokine for stimulating the growth of T cell lymphocytes
 Illinois Route 28, the former name of U.S. Route 34 in Illinois

See also

 
 
 IL (disambiguation)
 28 (disambiguation)